The lateral inferior genicular is an artery of the leg.

Course
It runs lateralward above the head of the fibula to the front of the knee-joint, passing in its course beneath the lateral head of the gastrocnemius, the fibular collateral ligament, and the tendon of the biceps femoris.

Branching
It ends by dividing into branches, which anastomose with the Inferior medial genicular and superior lateral genicular arteries, and with the anterior recurrent tibial artery.

See also
 Patellar anastomosis

References

Arteries of the lower limb